Dębówko  is a village in the administrative district of Gmina Przytoczna, within Międzyrzecz County, Lubusz Voivodeship, in western Poland.

References

Villages in Międzyrzecz County